The 2015 CONSUR Cup was the second year of the top division of Confederación Sudamericana de Rugby. Argentina were automatic seeds into the competition, with the top two teams from the 2014 South American Rugby Championship "A"; Paraguay and Uruguay playing alongside Los Pumas. For the second consecutive year, Argentina won the tournament, remaining as the top South American side.

Standings

Matches
The dates and venues were announced on 5 May.

Round 1

Round 2

Round 3

See also
 2015 South American Rugby Championship "A"
 2014 South American Rugby Championship "A"
 South American Rugby Championship

References

2015
2015 rugby union tournaments for national teams
    
2015 in Argentine rugby union
rugby union
rugby union
International rugby union competitions hosted by Uruguay
International rugby union competitions hosted by Paraguay